Murder Call is an Australian television series, created by Hal McElroy for the Southern Star Entertainment and broadcast on the Nine Network between 1997 and 2000. The series was inspired by the Tessa Vance novels by Jennifer Rowe, both of which were adapted as episodes, while Rowe also developed story treatments for 38 episodes throughout the series.

Synopsis
Murder Call focuses on cases confronted by an unconventional team of homicide detectives, Tessa Vance and Steve Hayden. Steve is an often light-hearted "man's man" who is moving up the career hierarchy. Tessa is more introspective and no-nonsense, and often solves the murder with her intuition and insight. Their team includes boss Inspector Malcolm Thorne, police Constable Dee Suzeraine, forensic services expert Lance Fisk, and unorthodox doctor Imogen "Tootsie" Soames.

Production
Murder Call was initially conceived as an adaptation of the Verity Birdwood murder mystery novels by Jennifer Rowe. Birdwood is an amateur private investigator, who spends her time as a freelance journalist for the ABC. Sigrid Thornton was attached to play the role, with the program given a 26-episode order by the Seven Network under the title Murder Calling. Ultimately, creative differences - reportedly over whether or not the series should adopt a cosy Murder, She Wrote-style approach - saw the Seven Network let go of the property. Production moved to the Nine Network, with a relocation from Melbourne to Sydney during which time Thornton dropped out. The series was retitled Murder Calls before settling on its final name. Ultimately, desiring to create a series with a darker vein than the Verity Birdwood novels, McElroy switched to Rowe's Tessa Vance series, comprising the novels Suspect/Deadline and Something Wicked. Rowe provided story treatments for 38 of the series' 56 episodes, which were then expanded upon by the screenwriters.

Murder Call was filmed in Sydney and often shot the less spectacular side of the city. The exterior of the Homicide station was filmed at Ashington House (formerly AFT House/Delfin House), on O'Connell Street in Sydney.

The first production season consisted of 22 episodes as well as a TV movie, Deadline, based on the novel of the same name by Rowe (which would ultimately air in two parts). The second production season consisted of 32 episodes, which were designed to be aired over two years. 

Ultimately, Nine aired the episodes over three televised seasons, dramatically out of production order. The third season commenced airing in 1999 but was cancelled in August of that year to budget concerns. The series was taken off air, with the final 9 episodes airing in late 2000. When the episodes were added to the 7plus streaming service in 2021, they were available in the original two production seasons, in order of production.

Cast
 Lucy Bell as Detective Tessa Vance
 Peter Mochrie as Detective Steve Hayden
 Glenda Linscott as Dr. Imogen "Tootsie" Soames 
 Geoff Morrell as Sergeant Lance Fisk 
 Jennifer Kent as Constable Dee Suzeraine 
 Gary Day as Detective Inspector Malcolm Thorne

Many notable or up-and-coming Australian actors guest starred on the program, including Melissa George, Dee Smart, Anne Tenney, Norman Kaye, Elizabeth Alexander, Essie Davis, Barry Otto, Jason Clarke, Zoe Carides, Bridie Carter, Michala Banas and Rose Byrne.

Episodes

Murder Call ran for three seasons and produced 56 episodes. See List of Murder Call episodes.

{| class="wikitable"
|-
! colspan="2" rowspan="2" width=3% |Season
! rowspan="2" width=5% |Episodes
! colspan="2" |Originally aired
! rowspan="2" width=5% |Network
|-
! width=15% | Season premiere
! width=15% | Season finale
|-
|bgcolor="8090FF" height="10px"|
|align="center"| 1
|align="center"| 16
|align="center"| 11 August 1997
|align="center"| 23 November 1997
| align="center" rowspan="3"| Nine Network
|-
|bgcolor="FFA080" height="10px"|
|align="center"| 2
|align="center"| 20
|align="center"| 7 July 1998
|align="center"| 24 November 1998
|-
|bgcolor="FF8090" height="10px"|
|align="center"| 3
|align="center"| 20
|align="center"| 21 April 1999
|align="center"| 9 October 2000
|-
|}

Home media 

It was announced by Via Vision Entertainment in March 2019 that they would be releasing the complete collection of Murder Call on DVD.

As of 2022, the series is available for streaming on Amazon Prime and 7plus. The episodes are rearranged into production, rather than broadcast, order.

References

External links
 Australian Television's Murder Call section
 A Murder Call review
 
 Murder Call – "Black Friday" at Australian Screen Online
 Murder Call - the National Film and Sound Archive

1997 Australian television series debuts
2000 Australian television series endings
1990s Australian drama television series
1990s Australian crime television series
Nine Network original programming
Television shows set in Sydney
Television shows based on Australian novels
Television series by Endemol Australia
2000s Australian drama television series
2000s Australian crime television series